Clara Nistad (born 8 February 1996) is a Swedish badminton player. In 2015, she won the Polish and Finnish International tournaments in the women's doubles event partnered with Emma Wengberg. In 2017, she and Wengberg won the women's doubles title at the Swedish International Series tournament.

Achievements

BWF International Challenge/Series (6 titles, 2 runners-up) 
Women's doubles

  BWF International Challenge tournament
  BWF International Series tournament
  BWF Future Series tournament

References

External links 
 

1996 births
Living people
Sportspeople from Stockholm
Swedish female badminton players
21st-century Swedish women